Uromyias is a genus of small Andean, tyrant flycatchers known as tit-tyrants. They were formerly recognized based on syrinxial and plumage characters, including a flatter crest and a longer tail, but was included within Anairetes due to genetic analysis. Recent analyses suggested splitting into Uromyias again.

The tit-tyrants are fairly small birds (11–14 cm) that get their common name from the tit family, due to their energetic tit-like dispositions and appearance, primarily in their crests. Tit-tyrants live in temperate or arid scrub habitats and are mainly found in the Andes mountains. It is one of only a few genera of small flycatchers that occur at such high altitudes.

Species
The genus contains two species:

References

Cited texts
 

 
Bird genera